Rasulabad Assembly constituency is a part of the Kanpur Dehat district of Uttar Pradesh and it comes under Kannauj Lok Sabha constituency.

Members of Legislative Assembly

Election results

2022

2017

2012

References

"Rasulabad Assembly Election 2012, Uttar Pradesh". Empowering India. Retrieved 8 July 2014.

External links
 

Assembly constituencies of Uttar Pradesh
Kanpur Dehat district